Street Cleaning Simulator (originally titled in German Kehrmaschinen-Simulator 2011) is a simulation game developed by TML Studios for Windows and released in 2011 by publishers Astragon and Excalibur Publishing.  The game received attention after it was given a review score of 1.5 in gaming site GameSpot, and gaining a user community score of 9.1, which became a theme for jokes on the site.

Reception

Street Cleaning Simulator received negative reviews from critics. Though GameSpot praised Street Cleaning Simulator's "nicely detailed sweeper vehicles" they also noted "Street Cleaning Simulator could only be considered a simulator in a world where the rules of gravity don't apply" and gave it a score of 1.5 out of 10.

The game became a running gag of some sort in GameSpot's community. In the user's review section of the game page, users used satirical remarks and praised the game in extreme ways such as 'I can't stop playing it' and 'I quit my job for it'.

References

External links
 

2011 video games
In-jokes
Simulation video games
Video games developed in Germany
Windows games
Windows-only games